The men's curling tournament of the 2014 Winter Olympics was held at the Ice Cube Curling Center in Sochi, Russia on 10–21 February 2014. Ten nations competed in a round robin preliminary round, and the top four nations at the conclusion of the round robin qualified for the medal round.

Teams
The teams are listed as follows:
{| class="wikitable" style="width:100%"
|-
!style="width:20%"|
!style="width:20%"|
!style="width:20%"|
!style="width:20%"|
!style="width:20%"|
|-
|Soo CA, Sault Ste. Marie {{ubl
 |Skip: Brad Jacobs
 |Third: Ryan Fry
 |Second: E. J. Harnden
 |Lead: Ryan Harnden
 |Alternate: Caleb Flaxey }}
|Harbin CC, Harbin 
|Hvidovre CC, Hvidovre 
|CC Hamburg, Hamburg 
|Curl Aberdeen, Aberdeen 
|-
!style="width:20%"|
!style="width:20%"|
!style="width:20%"|
!style="width:20%"|
!style="width:20%"|
|-
|Snarøen CC, Oslo 
|Moskvitch CC, Moscow 
|Karlstads CK, Karlstad 
|CC Adelboden, Adelboden 
|Duluth CC, Duluth 
|}

Round-robin standings

Round-robin results
All draw times are listed in Moscow Time (UTC+4).

Summary

Draw 1Monday, 10 February, 09:00Draw 2Monday, 10 February, 19:00Draw 3Tuesday, 11 February, 14:00Draw 4Wednesday, 12 February, 09:00Draw 5Wednesday, 12 February, 19:00Draw 6Thursday, 13 February, 14:00Draw 7Friday, 14 February, 09:00Draw 8Friday, 14 February, 19:00Draw 9Saturday, 15 February, 14:00Draw 10Sunday, 16 February, 09:00Draw 11Sunday, 16 February, 19:00Draw 12Monday, 17 February, 14:00TiebreakerTuesday, 18 February, 9:00Playoffs

SemifinalsWednesday, 19 February, 19:00Bronze medal gameFriday, 21 February, 12:30Gold medal gameFriday, 21 February, 17:30''

References

Curling at the 2014 Winter Olympics
Men's curling at the 2014 Winter Olympics
Men's events at the 2014 Winter Olympics